Margarita Voyska (born April 3, 1963, Sofia) is a Bulgarian chess player.

She has won the Women's Bulgarian Chess Championship 11 times.

She has competed for the Women's World Chess Championship several times, and has competed in the Women's Chess Olympiad in total 19 times between 1980-2016 which is the women's record in number of times one has participated in the Chess Olympiads. She was in the Bulgarian team that won the silver  medal in 1984. She won the Women's European Senior Chess Championship in 2013.

References

External links 

Margarita Voiska chess games and profile at chess-db.com
Margarita Voiska chess games on chessgames.com

Living people
Bulgarian female chess players
1963 births
Chess players from Sofia